Kirsi Marja Ylijoki (born 29 June 1969) is a Finnish actress and singer who first achieved fame for her role in the Finnish Soap Opera Sydän toivoa täynnä. Several TV roles followed.

In recent years she has held back her own career to raise her children with Apocalyptica's Eicca Toppinen, but she remains popular with Finnish audiences.

Ylijoki and Toppinen married in 1997, and have two sons; one born in 1999, the other 2002.

She and Toppinen are members of the rock band Cherry & the Vipers; Kirsi is the singer and Toppinen plays the drums.

Filmography

References

1969 births
Living people
Finnish rock singers
21st-century Finnish women singers
Place of birth missing (living people)
20th-century Finnish actresses
21st-century Finnish actresses
20th-century Finnish women singers